Psychoides phaedrospora is a moth of the family Tineidae, first described by Edward Meyrick in 1935. It is found in Japan.

References

Tineidae
Moths described in 1935
Moths of Japan
Taxa named by Edward Meyrick